The antineutron is the antiparticle of the neutron with symbol . It differs from the neutron only in that some of its properties have equal magnitude but opposite sign. It has the same mass as the neutron, and no net electric charge, but has opposite baryon number (+1 for neutron, −1 for the antineutron). This is because the antineutron is composed of antiquarks, while neutrons are composed of quarks. The antineutron consists of one up antiquark and two down antiquarks.

Background 

The antineutron was discovered in proton–antiproton collisions at the Bevatron (Lawrence Berkeley National Laboratory) by the team of Bruce Cork, Glen Lambertson, Oreste Piccioni, and William Wenzel in 1956, one year after the antiproton was discovered.

Since the antineutron is electrically neutral, it cannot easily be observed directly. Instead, the products of its annihilation with ordinary matter are observed. In theory, a free antineutron should decay into an antiproton, a positron and a neutrino in a process analogous to the beta decay of free neutrons. There are theoretical proposals of neutron–antineutron oscillations, a process that implies the violation of the baryon number conservation.

Magnetic moment
The magnetic moment of the antineutron is the opposite of that of the neutron. Here μN is the nuclear magneton.

See also
Antimatter
Neutron magnetic moment
List of particles

References

External links
 LBL Particle Data Group: summary tables
 suppression of neutron-antineutron oscillation
 Elementary particles: includes information about antineutron discovery (archived link)
 "Is Antineutron the Same as Neutron?" explains how the antineutron differs from the regular neutron despite having the same, that is zero, charge.

Antimatter
Baryons
Neutron
Nucleons